Jordan national under-23 football team (also known as Jordan Under-23 or Jordan Olympic Team) represents Jordan in international football competitions in Olympic Games and Asian Games. It is controlled by the Jordan Football Association. Jordan Olympic Team won the bronze medal in the 2013 AFC U-22 Championship in Oman.

Team image

Kit providers
 Jako (2006–2009)
 Uhlsport (2009–2010)
 Adidas (2010–2012)
 Jako (2012–2015)
 Adidas (2015–)

Recent fixtures

2021

2022

Coaching history
  Mohammad Awad (1988–1992)
  Issa Al-Turk (2002–2003)
  Nihad Al-Souqar (2006–2007)
  Alaa' Nabil (2010–2011)
  Islam Al-Thiabat (of U-22) (2012–2014) 
  Jamal Abu Abed (2013–2016)
  Ahmed Abdel-Qader (2016)
  Iain Brunskill (2016–)

Current technical staff

Current squad
The following player list was announced on 16 May 2022 for the 2022 AFC U-23 Asian Cup.

Head coach: Ahmad Hayel

Previous squads
AFC U-23 Championship
 2013 AFC U22 Championship squad
 2016 AFC U23 Championship squad
 2018 AFC U23 Championship squad
 2020 AFC U23 Championship squad
 2022 AFC U23 Asian Cup squad
Asian Games
 2006 Asian Games squad
 2010 Asian Games squad
 2014 Asian Games squad

Tournament records

Summer Olympics
Since 1992, football at the Summer Olympics changes into Under-23 tournament.

AFC U-23 Championship

Asian Games

WAFF U-23 Championship

International cups/friendly tournaments
2008 Norway - Middle East U21 National Team Tournament (second place)
2012 Palestine International Cup (group stage)
2014 Palestine International Championship (second place)

See also
 Jordan national football team
 Jordan national under-20 football team 
 Jordan national under-17 football team 
 Jordan national under-14 football team
 Jordan women's national football team

References

External links

 

u23
Asian national under-23 association football teams